Providence Island may refer to:

Providencia Island, part of the Archipelago of San Andres, Providencia and Santa Catalina in Colombia, which was settled by the Providence Island Company
Providence Island colony, the English settlement on this island
Providence Island, Seychelles in Providence Atoll in Seychelles
Ujelang Atoll, which the captain of the British merchant vessel Providence rediscovered in 1811 and named after his vessel
Providence Island, one of the roughly 80 islands of Lake Champlain in North America
Providence Island, Liberia is the island on coast of Liberia where American freedmen first colonized.